"Going to hell in a handbasket", "going to hell in a handcart", "going to hell in a handbag", "go to hell in a bucket", "sending something to hell in a handbasket" and "something being like hell in a handbasket" are variations on an allegorical locution of unclear origin, which describes a situation headed for disaster inescapably or precipitately.

Possible origins
The origin of the phrase has been much debated. Its usage may be dated to the baskets used to catch guillotined heads in the eighteenth century. Early visualizations of the phrase might possibly be associated with religious iconography such as the stained glass windows of Fairford Church in Gloucestershire and Hieronymus Bosch's painting The Haywain, circa 1515, which portrays a large cart of hay being drawn by "infernal beings that drag everyone to Hell".

19th century usages
In the 19th century, the phrase has been found associated with the American gold rush of the 1840s where men were lowered by hand in baskets down mining shafts to set explosives which could have deadly consequences. 

The phrase has been used in sermons since at least 1841, as can be seen in the publication, Short Patent Sermons: "[Those people] who would rather ride to hell in a hand-cart than walk to heaven supported by the staff of industry". Also in 1841, a mention of the phrase can be found in The Star of Freedom: "..Sanctified hypocrites will tell you not, and that, do what you will, you are all to go to hell in a handbasket, thereby, in fact, making you mere passive creatures in this world passive to their will..."

In 1862, the journal Weekly Pacquet of Advice from Rome: or, The History of Popery stated: "...that noise of a Popish Plot was nothing in the world but an intrigue of the Whigs to destroy the Kings best Friends, and the Devil fetch me to Hell in a Hand basket, if I might have my will, there should not be one Fanatical Dog left alive in the three Kingdoms."

I. Winslow Ayer's 1865 polemic alleges, "Judge Morris of the Circuit Court of Illinois at an August meeting of Order of the Sons of Liberty said: "Thousands of our best men were prisoners in Camp Douglas, and if once at liberty would 'send abolitionists to hell in a hand basket.

In popular culture 
Various versions of the phrase have appeared in the title of several published works and other media:
To Hell in a Handbag is the title of a 2016 comic play by Helen Norton and Jonathan White.
To Hell in a Handbasket is the name of humorist H. Allen Smith's 1962 autobiography.
Hell in a Handbasket was the title of a 1988 Star Trek comic book.
Hell in a Handbasket is the title of a 2006 book by American cartoonist Tom Tomorrow, who authors the cartoon strip This Modern World.
"Hell in a handbasket" was the name of an undescribed con requiring a trained cat referenced in the 2004 film, Ocean's Twelve.
"Hell in a Bucket" is a song off of the Grateful Dead's 1987 album In the Dark.
Hell in a Handbasket is a song from Voltaire's Ooky Spooky album.
Hell in a Handbasket is the title of a 2011 Meat Loaf album.

References

English phrases
Hell in popular culture